Breton  is a village in central Alberta, Canada.

History
Originally called Keystone, it was established in 1909 by a group of African-American immigrants as a block settlement.    The new Black Canadian homesteaders arrived from Oklahoma, Kansas, and Texas, just four years after Alberta became a province in 1905.

In 1927 the town was renamed after politician Douglas Breton, in his second year as the region's Member of the Alberta Legislature.

Infrastructure
It has one High School (grades 7–12) and one elementary (K-6) school. It has a Paid on call Fire department operating with the Brazeau county fire services, two grocery stores, two golf courses, four restaurants, two hair parlors, a police station with three officers and one secretary.

Demographics

In the 2016 Census of Population conducted by Statistics Canada, the Village of Breton recorded a population of 574 living in 252 of its 292 total private dwellings, a  change from its 2011 population of 496.

The Village of Breton's 2012 municipal census counted a population of 581, a 0.3% increase over its 2007 municipal census population of 579.

See also 
List of communities in Alberta
List of villages in Alberta
Similar 1908 to 1910 Alberta homesteader settlements of  Black Canadians:
Amber Valley, Alberta
Campsie, Alberta
Junkins (now Wildwood), Alberta

References

External links 

1909 establishments in Alberta
Black Canadian culture in Alberta
Villages in Alberta
Black Canadian settlements
Populated places established by African Americans